Origin of the Milky Way may refer to:
 Formation of galaxies
 The Origin of the Milky Way (Tintoretto)
 The Origin of the Milky Way (Rubens)